Jeepers Creepers 2 is a 2003 American horror film written and directed by Victor Salva. A sequel to the 2001 film Jeepers Creepers, the film finds the Creeper, a demonic creature and mysterious serial killer who pursues a school bus filled with high school students. Ray Wise also appears as Jack Taggart, a farmer who seeks to hunt down and kill the Creeper as revenge for his younger son who the Creeper had murdered that same week. Additionally, Francis Ford Coppola returned to the franchise as an executive producer.

Produced by Myriad Pictures and American Zoetrope, filming for Jeepers Creepers 2 took place in Tejon Ranch, and Long Beach, California in 2002. The film was theatrically released by United Artists in the United States on August 29, 2003, where it was met with mostly negative reviews from critics. With a $17 million budget, the film grossed between $63.1 and $120 million worldwide (sources differ) and spawned a prequel, released as Jeepers Creepers 3 in 2017.

Plot

Three days after the events of the first film and a day after the events of the third film, the Creeper abducts a young Billy Taggart in front of his father Jack Sr., his older brother Jack Jr. and their dog Mac in its 22nd day of feeding. The next day, a school bus carrying a high school basketball team and cheerleaders suffers a blowout, after one of the tires is hit by a hand-crafted shuriken made of bone fragments. Later a cheerleader named Minxie Hayes has a vision of Billy Taggart and Darry Jenner who attempt to warn her about the Creeper before it blows out another tire and disables the bus. With the team stranded, the Creeper abducts bus driver Betty Borman and coaches Charlie Hanna and Dwayne Barnes. When the Creeper returns, he singles out six of the students: Dante Belasco, Jake Spencer, Minxie Hayes, Scotty Braddock, Andy "Bucky" Buck, and Deaundre "Double D" Davis. Minxie has another vision in which Darry says the Creeper emerges every 23rd spring for 23 days to eat humans and she tells the other students.

After hearing several police reports, the Taggarts go hunting for the Creeper and soon make radio contact with the school bus. The Creeper attacks Bucky, but Rhonda stabs it through the head with a javelin. Dante begins prodding the Creeper's wing, only for it to grab and decapitate him. The Creeper tears off its injured head and uses Dante's severed head to replace its own. The students decide to leave the bus to find help, but the Creeper returns and chases them into a field, where it kills Jake and takes Scotty.

When the Creeper attacks Jonny, Chelsea, and Bucky on the bus again, the Taggarts and Mac arrive and Jack shoots it with a homemade harpoon, which the Creeper fights him off, managing to escape after flipping over the bus. Rhonda, Izzy Cohen, and Double D find a truck and attempt to escape but are chased by the Creeper again. Izzy pushes Rhonda out of the truck before causing the vehicle to crash, injuring both Double D and the Creeper, who loses an arm, a leg, and a wing, although Izzy crawls from the wreckage before the truck explodes. The Creeper continues to pursue Double D by leaping towards him and, when it has Double D pinned down, Jack shows up and shoots the Creeper in the head with the harpoon. He repeatedly stabs the Creeper in its heart but it goes into a hibernation state before it can die.

23 years later, three teenagers drive out to the Taggart farm, where the Creeper is a sideshow attraction called "A Bat Out of Hell" and the middle-aged Jack Jr. is charging entrance fees. They see an elderly Jack Sr. watching it with the harpoon at his side and when they ask him if he is waiting for something, he looks up at the Creeper and says "About three more days, give or take a day or two".

Cast
Credits adapted from the British Film Institute.

Additionally, voice actor Bob Papenbrook appears as the man in the station wagon near the start of the film, while Marshall Cook, Joe Reegan, and Stephanie Denise Griffin star as the group seen at the end. Writer and director Victor Salva also makes a small, uncredited cameo appearance on the cover of a magazine briefly shown on the bus.

Release 
Jeepers Creepers 2 opened in 3,124 theaters and had a U.S. domestic gross of $35.6 million. Other international takings were between $27.4 and $84.3 million, depending on the source. The worldwide gross was $63.1–120 million, higher than the original. It displaced its predecessor, Jeepers Creepers, to become the new record holder for the highest ever Labor Day opening weekend four-day gross, holding the record until the 2005 release of Transporter 2.  After the 2020 Labor Day weekend, Jeepers Creepers 2 still holds the #6 spot with the #8 spot still held by Jeepers Creepers. Allowing for films that had been released prior to Labor Day, Jeepers Creepers 2 holds the #9 spot after the 2015 Labor Day four-day weekend.

On December 23, 2003, MGM released the film on VHS and DVD. It was released on Blu-ray twice as a double feature with the first film, once by Shout! Factory.

Reception
Rotten Tomatoes, a review aggregator, reports that 24% of 127 surveyed critics gave the film a positive review; the average rating is 4.2/10. The site's critical consensus reads: "Jeepers Creepers 2 is competently made, but it doesn't have the scares of the original." Metacritic rated it 36/100 based on 29 reviews. Andy Klein of Variety wrote, "Few things are scarier than a sequel to a bad movie, but, in fact, Jeepers Creepers 2 is substantially better than its predecessor, even while staying strictly within the genre's well-defined boundaries."  Michael Rechtshaffen of The Hollywood Reporter wrote, "The sequel has got the creepy bits down cold but lacks a fair share of scares."  Roger Ebert, writing for The Chicago Sun-Times, rated the film one out of four stars and said, "Victor Salva's Jeepers Creepers 2 supplies us with a first-class creature, a fourth-rate story, and dialogue possibly created by feeding the screenplay into a pasta maker."  In The New York Times, Dave Kehr wrote that creature lacks personality when the concept is retooled into a film series.  Gene Seymour of the Los Angeles Times wrote that the sequel lacks the mood of the first film, and the teen protagonists are too annoying to draw much of the audience's sympathy.  However, Seymour praised Wise's performance.  In a positive review, Nathan Rabin of The A.V. Club called it "the rare sequel that's not only bigger than its predecessor, but also better".

Audiences polled by CinemaScore gave the film an average grade of "C+" on an A+ to F scale.

Awards
 Nomination – Academy of Science Fiction, Fantasy & Horror Films
 Nomination – Saturn Award Best Horror Film
 Nomination – Motion Picture Sound Editors: Golden Reel Award Best Sound Editing in a Feature Film (David Bondelevitch and Victor Salva)

Prequel
In September 2015, Jeepers Creepers 3 was officially greenlit. The film was slated to begin filming in April 2016 until production was halted when Victor Salva was boycotted from filming in Canada for his criminal past.

The film was eventually released in a one-night-only showing on September 26, 2017, 14 years after the release of Jeepers Creepers 2. It grossed $2.3 million in theaters.

References

External links

 
 
 
 
 

Jeepers Creepers (film series)
2003 films
2003 horror films
2000s monster movies
American teen horror films
Demons in film
American monster movies
American road movies
2000s road movies
American sequel films
American Zoetrope films
United Artists films
Films directed by Victor Salva
Films shot in Los Angeles County, California
2000s English-language films
2000s American films